Blidworth and Rainworth railway station was a railway station which served the villages of Blidworth and Rainworth, Nottinghamshire, England.

History
The station opened in 1871 as Rainworth when the Midland Railway opened a line from Southwell to Mansfield.

It was renamed Blidworth on 24 March 1877.  

The station closed to passengers on 12 August 1929 when the Mansfield to Southwell section, which passed through a mining area, closed to passengers. The railway replaced it with a road motor omnibus service provided in conjunction with Mansfield and District Tramways Limited connecting with the railway stations between Mansfield and Newark. Freight services continued until 25 June 1964.

Nothing remains of the station or trackbed and it has been lost to a housing development called Curzon Close.

Services

Stationmasters
A. Nowell 1872 - 1875 (formerly station master at Worthington)
E. Prisgrane 1875 - 1879
G. Lambert 1879 - 1884
W. Doughty 1884 - 1908
Charles Walter Chapple 1908 - 1929

References

Disused railway stations in Nottinghamshire
Railway stations in Great Britain opened in 1871
Railway stations in Great Britain closed in 1929
Former Midland Railway stations
Rainworth